The following is a timeline of the history of the city of Laredo, Texas, USA.

18th-19th centuries

 1755 - May 15: Villa de Laredo founded by Tomás Sánchez and others in Spanish colonial Nuevo Santander, Viceroyalty of New Spain.
 1760 - Chapel built.
 1767 - San Agustin Church founded.
 1790 - Population: 708.
 1821 - Laredo becomes part of independent Mexican Empire.
 1840 - Laredo becomes capital of the Mexican insurgent Republic of the Rio Grande during the Mexican Federalist War.
 1846 - Laredo taken by U.S. Texas Rangers during the Mexican–American War.
 1847 - U.S. forces occupy town.
 1848
 Laredo becomes part of the U.S. per Treaty of Guadalupe Hidalgo at end of Mexican–American War.
 Webb County, Texas created.
 1849 - U.S. military Camp Crawford established.
 1852 - Laredo "chartered as a Texas city."
 1860 - Population: 1,256.
 1872 - San Agustin Church rebuilt.
 1880
 Corpus Christi-Laredo railway begins operating.
 Population: 3,521.
 1881
 Mexico-Laredo railway begins operating.
 St. Peter's neighborhood development begins.
 City plan for Laredo and Nuevo Laredo, "'Plano de los Dos Laredos' created by E.R. Laroche."
 1882
 Laredo Seminary and city water works established.
 County Courthouse built.
 1883 - Daily Laredo Times newspaper begins publication.
 1888 - Laredo Improvement Company formed.
 1889
 Street railway begins operating.
 "Foot and wagon bridge built across the Rio Grande" at Convent Avenue.
 1890 - Population: 11,319.
 1898 - Onion farming begins (approximate date).
 1900 - Population: 13,429.

20th century

 1904 - Laredo Academy established.
 1907 - Laredo United States Post Office, Court House and Custom House built.
 1908 - Discovery of natural gas in vicinity of Laredo.
 1909 - Webb County Courthouse built.
 1910 - Population: 14,855.
 1911 - Liga Femenil Mexicanista (women's group) founded in Laredo.
 1915 - Laredo public library active (approximate date).
 1920
 Texas Mexican Railway International Bridge opened.
 Population: 22,710.
 1922
 International Bridge opens.
 Azteca Theater opens.
 1937 - Foundry Workers' Union of Laredo formed.
 1938 - KPAB radio begins broadcasting.
 1946 - Fort McIntosh, Texas de-activated.
 1947 - Laredo Junior College established.
 1950 - Population: 51,910.
 1954 - Flood.
 1956 - KGNS-TV (television) begins broadcasting.
 1969 - Texas A&M International University established.
 1970
 River Drive Mall in business.
 Population: 69,678.
 1977 - Mall del Norte in business.
 1978 - Aldo Tatangelo becomes mayor.
 1980
 Webb County Heritage Foundation established.
 Population: 91,449.
 1990
 Saul N. Ramirez, Jr. becomes mayor.
 Population: 122,899.
 1993
 Laredo Community College active.
 Cinemark Movies 12 (cinema) in business.
 1998 - Betty Flores becomes mayor.
 2000
 Roman Catholic Diocese of Laredo established.
 Population: 176,576.

21st century

 2001 - City website online (approximate date).
 2005 - Henry Cuellar becomes U.S. representative for Texas's 28th congressional district.
 2006 - Raul G. Salinas becomes mayor.
 2007 - Cinemark Mall Del Norte (cinema) in business.
 2008 - Rio Grande Detention Center opens, housing up to 1900 federal prisoners for the U.S. government 
 2010 - Population: 236,091.
 2014 - Pete Saenz becomes mayor.

See also
 Laredo, Texas history (es)
 List of mayors of Laredo, Texas
 National Register of Historic Places listings in Webb County, Texas
 Nuevo Laredo, Mexico history (es)
 Timelines of other cities in the South Texas area of Texas: Brownsville, Corpus Christi, McAllen, San Antonio

References

Bibliography

 
 
 
 
 Stanley Cooper Green, Laredo, 1755–1920 (Laredo: Nuevo Santander Museum Complex, 1981)
 Gilberto Miguel Hinojosa, A Borderlands Town in Transition: Laredo, 1755–1870 (College Station: Texas A&M University Press, 1983)
 Jerry Don Thompson, Laredo: A Pictorial History (Norfolk: Donning, 1986)

External links

 
 
 
 Items related to Laredo, various dates (via Digital Public Library of America).

 
Laredo